Exa or EXA may refer to:

 exa-, a metric prefix denoting a factor of 1018
 EXA, a graphics acceleration architecture
 Ecuadorian Civilian Space Agency
 Exa Corporation, an American software developer
 Exa TV, a Mexican television channel
 My-HiME EXA, an anime comedy series
 Nissan EXA, an automobile
 Shining Force EXA, a video game
 Exa, a range of small-format Exakta cameras
 exa (command-line utility), a program for listing files